Pirtua, pirtua is a 1991 Finnish drama movie directed by Visa Mäkinen. The plot consists of a young man fighting against bootleggers in his home village during Finnish prohibition.

The movie, which was Visa Mäkinen's first attempt at a serious movie, ended up a box office flop, with only 1,650 tickets sold and caused losses of a million Finnish markka. Mäkinen gave up on making movies as a result. When Pirtua, Pirtua aired on the Finnish television channel MTV3 in May 1995, it was seen by 287,000 viewers. In June 2001, another 180,000 television viewers saw the movie.

Critical reception 
In the movie guide Video-opas in 1994, critic Olavi Similä praises the depiction of the subject matter, but finds the content mediocre, giving the movie a grade of two starts out of five.

References

External links 

 

1991 films
Finnish crime drama films
1990s thriller drama films
1991 crime thriller films
1991 crime drama films
Finnish thriller drama films
1990s Finnish-language films